Reopalu Cemetery is a cemetery in Paide, Estonia.

The cemetery was established in 1774.

Notable burials
 August Wilhelm Hupel, Baltic German publicist, estophile and linguist
 Juhan Leinberg (prophet Maltsvet), Estonian religious leader

References

External links
 Reopalu Cemetery, entry in HAUDI (cemeteries' database)
 

Cemeteries in Estonia
Paide
1774 establishments in the Russian Empire